Somme-Leuze is a municipality of Wallonia located in the province of Namur, Belgium.

On 1 January 2006 the municipality had 4,656 inhabitants. The total area is 95.09 km², giving a population density of 49 inhabitants per km².

The municipality consists of the following districts: Baillonville, Bonsin (including Chardeneux), Heure-en-Famenne, Hogne, Nettinne, Noiseux, Sinsin, Somme-Leuze, and Waillet.

See also
 List of protected heritage sites in Somme-Leuze

References

External links
 
Official website

 
Municipalities of Namur (province)